Mikayel Arturi Mikayelyan (born 10 July 1999 in Ashotsk) is a cross-country skier who was the flag bearer for Armenia at the 2018 Winter Olympics Parade of Nations.

In January 2022, Mikayelyan was named to Armenia's 2022 Olympic team.

References 

1999 births
Living people
Cross-country skiers at the 2018 Winter Olympics
Cross-country skiers at the 2022 Winter Olympics
Armenian male cross-country skiers
Olympic cross-country skiers of Armenia
Cross-country skiers at the 2016 Winter Youth Olympics